Flynn Pérez (born 25 August 2001) is an Australian rules footballer who plays for the North Melbourne Football Club in the Australian Football League (AFL). He was recruited by North Melbourne with the 35th draft pick in the 2019 AFL draft.

Early life and football career
Pérez was born in Bendigo, Victoria. He was educated at Catherine McAuley College.

Pérez played football for the Sandhurst Football Netball Club. He was named to play in Team Bartel in the Under 17 Futures grand final curtain raiser. Pérez played for the Bendigo Pioneers in the NAB League. He played 15 games and averaged 16.5 disposals in his 2018 season, but suffered an ACL injury and missed the entire 2019 season.

AFL career
On debut, Perez collected nine disposals, took four marks and made three tackles.

Statistics
Statistics are correct to the 2020 season

|- style="background:#EAEAEA"
| scope="row" text-align:center | 2020
| 
| 39 || 3 || 0 || 0 || 15 || 13 || 28 || 7 || 8 || 0.0 || 0.0 || 5.0 || 4.3 || 9.3 || 2.3 || 2.7
|- style="background:#EAEAEA; font-weight:bold; width:2em"
| scope="row" text-align:center class="sortbottom" colspan=3 | Career
| 3
| 0
| 0
| 15
| 13
| 28
| 7
| 8
| 0.0
| 0.0
| 5.0
| 4.3
| 9.3
| 2.3
| 2.7
|}

References

External links

2001 births
Living people
North Melbourne Football Club players
Australian rules footballers from Victoria (Australia)
Sandhurst Football Club players